Mulika Lodge Airport  is an airport in Meru National Park, in Meru County, Kenya.

Location

Overview
Mulika Lodge Airport is a small civilian airport, serving Meru National Park and the neighboring town of Meru.

Scheduled airlines and destinations

See also
 Kenya Airports Authority
 Kenya Civil Aviation Authority
 List of airports in Kenya

References

External links
 Details of Some of Kenya's Airport Runways
  Website of Kenya Airports Authority
 List of Airports In Kenya
  Airkenya Routes
 

Airports in Kenya
Eastern Province (Kenya)
Meru County